Puerto Rico Highway 64 (PR-64) is a short divided highway in Mayagüez, Puerto Rico which serves as an alternate route to Puerto Rico Highway 2, beginning at Puerto Rico Highway 102 toward barrio Sabanetas. It meets PR-2 again near Añasco. It is mostly divided. It is also a route to the Mayagüez Port, where a ferry can be taken to Santo Domingo, Dominican Republic.

Major intersections

See also

 List of highways numbered 64

References

External links
 

064
Roads in Mayagüez, Puerto Rico